Glasgow City B.C. are a Scottish basketball club, based in the east end of the city of Glasgow, Scotland.

History
The club was founded in 1982, by locals James ‘Mick’ McKechnie and Willie Cameron. Over its history, the club has produced many locally based players who have represented Scotland.

Success
The club most successful spell was in the late 1990s and early 2000s, when it won the Men's National League title in 1999, the Scottish Men's Cup in 1997 and 2000 and the Women's Cup in 1999. During this time, the club were sponsored by Sir Tom Hunter's Sports Division, and later by his new company d2.

Expansion rumours
In 1994, the Brightsiders, as they were then known, were considered as a potential expansion team for the top-tier British Basketball League, to be the first Scottish involvement in the league since Livingston and Glasgow Rangers dropped out of the league at the end of the 1988–89 season. The Brightsiders that year also competed in the World Invitation Club Basketball competition in London. In 1999, the team were considered for invitation to the BBL Trophy, after rumours circulated the club were in talks to take over the league franchise of the Worthing Bears.

Decline
The team's success dried up and following several years of bottom-half finishes, the club eventually withdrew from the National League at the end of the 2006–07 season.

Remergence
Following over 10 years away from the national league, the senior men's team re-entered National League Division 2 in 2019.

Teams
City will field the following teams for the 2019–20 season:

Senior Men: National League Division 2
Senior Women: Strathclyde League
U18 Men: National League U18 Division 2

U18 Men II: Strathclyde U18 League
U18 Women: National League U18 Division 1
U16 Men: Strathclyde U16 League

Home Venue
Eastbank Academy, Shettleston
Bannerman High School, Baillieston
St Andrew's RC Secondary School, Greenfield
St Mungo's Academy, Bridgeton

Men's team

Honours
Scottish League
Winner: 1999
Scottish Cup
Winner: 1997, 2000
Runner-up: 1994, 1995, 1996, 1998

Season-by-season records

Women's team

Honours
Scottish Cup
Winner: 1999

Notable players

References

External links
Official website
Profile at EuroBasket.com

Basketball teams in Scotland
1982 establishments in Scotland
Sports teams in Glasgow
Basketball teams established in 1982